Glenn Brown  (born 1966 in Hexham, Northumberland) is a British artist known for the use of appropriation in his paintings. Starting with reproductions from other artists' works, Glenn Brown transforms the appropriated image by changing its colour, position, orientation, height and width relationship, mood and/or size. Despite these changes, he has occasionally been accused of plagiarism.

He has had a number of solo exhibitions: at the Serpentine Gallery in London in 2004, at the Kunsthistorisches Museum in Vienna in 2008, at Tate Liverpool in 2009 (later shown at the Fondazione Sandretto Re Rebaudengo in Turin), at the Ludwig Múzeum in Budapest in 2010, and at the Fondation Vincent Van Gogh in Arles, in Provence, in 2016. 

Brown lives and works in London and Suffolk, England. He was nominated for the Turner Prize in 2000. There was some controversy over his exhibition at Tate Britain for the Turner Prize, as one of the paintings was closely based on the science-fiction illustration "Double Star" produced in 1973 by the artist Tony Roberts.

Brown was appointed Commander of the Order of the British Empire (CBE) in the 2019 Birthday Honours for services to art.

Education

Brown completed his Foundation Course at Norwich School of Art & Design (1985) and later on received a B.A. degree in Fine Art at Bath School of Art and Design (1985–1988), followed by an M.A. degree at Goldsmiths College (1990–1992).

Technique and style

Brown appropriates images by living, working artists, such as Frank Auerbach and Georg Baselitz, as well as paintings by historical artists, such as Guido Reni, Diego Velázquez, Anthony van Dyck, Rembrandt, Jean-Honoré Fragonard, Eugène Delacroix, John Martin, Gustave Courbet, Adolph Menzel, Pierre-Auguste Renoir, Vincent van Gogh, Chaïm Soutine and Salvador Dalí. He claims that the references to these artists are not direct quotations, but alterations and combinations of several works by different artists,  although the artists whose work is appropriated do not always agree. As art critic Michael Bracewell states, Brown is "less concerned with the art-historical status of those works he appropriates than with their ability to serve his purpose – namely his epic exploration of paint and painting." In most cases, the artist uses reproductions printed in exhibition catalogues, found on the internet or ordered through print-on-demand companies.

Once the composition is found, the paint is applied in the artist's very specific process of painting. Brown's paintings, which are uniformly smooth in surface, typically offer a trompe-l'œil illusion of turbulent, painterly application. In fact, many viewers of his work have expressed the sensation of wanting to "lick" and "touch" the paintings. Brown uses thin brushes with which he produces particularly elongated curls and twists. The resulting flatness of the painting alludes to its origin as the chosen photograph or digital image. Per the artist Michael Stubbs: "Brown‘s computer-based preparation method prior to painting is [not] the sole reason for his relation with the digital. The computer increases and develops his choices of found imagery, but it is only a means, not the end. […]. On the contrary, his works are markers for the future of painting because they are both surface effect and material methodology, not despite the screen, but because of it."

A lot of his titles refer to titles of albums, film titles, science fiction literature, or a specific dedication to a person. The titles are not obviously connected to the paintings themselves and are not meant to be descriptive of the artwork. Instead they are intended to complement it. Brown: "That‘s it – the titles are often trying to be embarrassingly direct, and vulgar in their directness. I don‘t think that the painting is less direct, but I don‘t want the paintings to be illustrative."

Paintings 

The subject matter in Glenn Brown's paintings ranges from his early science-fiction landscapes over abstract compositions and still lives to the figurative images based on art historical references. Most paintings share a morbid, almost creepy atmosphere, which is especially underlined by the incorporation of certain unsightly physical features of his figures such as yellowish decaying teeth, translucently white blind-looking eyeballs, unnatural skin colours and suggestions of foulness and smell emanating from figures' bodies. Brown: "I like my paintings to have one foot in the grave, as it were, and to be not quite of this world. I would like them to exist in a dream world, which I think of as being the place that they occupy, a world that is made up of the accumulation of images that we have stored in our subconscious, and that coagulate and mutate when we sleep."  Many of Brown's portraits depict amorphous beings that have been described as "tumurous lumps that look like outsized, inflamed organs". Often they are ironically attributed with recurring features such as flowers growing out of their compost-like bodies, hallows placed over heads or red noses. In few of these amorphous and abstract forms, female figures are embedded within the mottling masses of unidentifiable matter.

Etchings 

In 2008 Brown created a series of prints entitled "Layered Etchings (Portraits)" which were inspired by the artists Urs Graf, Rembrandt and Lucian Freud. Brown scanned a vast number of reproductions from books and digitally manipulated them by stretching them to standard sizes. He then layered selected scans over each other, resulting in single images for which a handful of etching plates were made. The many contour and incarnation lines of the original works (the artist used up to fifteen different image sources for one layered portrait), as well as the textured spots of lithographic printing, obscure the sitters' individual identities. The resulting half-length portraits are "de-individualised" by the deliberate accumulation of too many portraits over each other.

The etchings were collated in Glenn Brown: Etchings (Portraits), published by Ridinghouse in 2009 which featured a specially commissioned text by John-Paul Stonard that discusses elements of the old and the new in the portraits as they embody concepts of destruction and the violence of appropriation.

Controversy

In 2000  Brown was accused of plagiarism by The Times. Glenn Brown referenced a work by Anthony Roberts for a science fiction novel cover. The photographer Wolfgang Tillmans won the Turner prize that year, and a legal case brought by Roberts against Brown was settled out of court.

Public collections

Art Institute of Chicago, Chicago

Arts Council Collection, London

British Museum, London

Delfina Foundation, London

Fondazione Sandretto Re Rebaudengo, Turin

FRAC - Limousin, Limoges

Francois Pinault Foundation, Venice

Musée National d'Art Moderne, Centre Georges Pompidou, Paris

Rennie Collection, Vancouver

Tate, London

The Laing Art Gallery, Newcastle

The Museum of Modern Art, New York

The New Art Gallery, Walsall

Walker Art Center, Minneapolis

V-A-C Collection, Moscow

Zabludowicz Collection, London

References

External links 
Galerie Max Hetzler, Glenn Brown
https://vimeo.com/137309687 Glenn Brown lecturing at the College de France about his practice
 https://archive.today/20130703015419/http://www.culturecritic.co.uk/blog/culturecritic-interviews-glenn-brown/ CultureCritic interview with Glenn Brown on the occasion of his participation at SNAP Art Festival, Suffolk
Michael Stubbs, Glenn Brown and Keith Tyson in conversation
Glenn Brown at the Frans Hals Museum.

20th-century English painters
English male painters
21st-century English painters
21st-century English male artists
Living people
People from Hexham
1966 births
Alumni of Norwich University of the Arts
English contemporary artists
Commanders of the Order of the British Empire
20th-century English male artists